The 2021 Menards 250 was the ninth race of the 2021 ARCA Menards Series season, the third race of the 2021 Sioux Chief Showdown, and the seventh iteration of the event. The race was held on Saturday, July 10, 2021, in Elko New Market, Minnesota at Elko Speedway, a  permanent oval-shaped racetrack. The race took the scheduled 250 laps to complete. In a fierce battle in the closing laps, Corey Heim of Venturini Motorsports and Ty Gibbs of Joe Gibbs Racing would battle with three to go, with Heim besting Gibbs for his fifth career ARCA Menards Series win, the fourth of the season, and the second straight win for Heim.

Background 
Elko Speedway, is a 3/8 mile asphalt oval NASCAR-sanctioned race track located in Elko New Market, Minnesota. Elko Speedway is a track in the NASCAR Advance Auto Parts Weekly Series. The track is located in the former Elko portion of the merged city.

Entry list

Practice

First and final practice 
The only one-hour practice session would take place on Saturday, July 10, at 3:30 PM CST.

Qualifying 
Qualifying would take place on Saturday, July 10, at 5:30 PM CST. Drivers would each run two laps to set a best time.

Full qualifying results

Race results

References 

2021 ARCA Menards Series
NASCAR races at Elko Speedway
Menards 250
Menards 250